Tillietudlem railway station served Tillietudlem, a village in South Lanarkshire, Scotland.  It opened in 1876 and was closed in 1951.

References

Disused railway stations in South Lanarkshire
Railway stations in Great Britain closed in 1876
Railway stations in Great Britain closed in 1951
Former Caledonian Railway stations